Jórunn skáldmær ("poet-maiden") was a Norwegian skald active in the first half of the 10th century. Only two stanzas and three half-stanzas of her Sendibítr ("Biting message") were preserved, mostly in Snorri Sturluson's works, such as Saga of Harald Fairhair and Skáldskaparmál. The Sendibítr, which deals with a conflict between Harald Fairhair and his son Halfdan the Black, is the longest recorded skaldic poem composed by a woman.

See also

 Hildr Hrólfsdóttir
 Gunnhildr konungamóðir
 Steinunn Refsdóttir

Notes

External links
Jórunn's Sendibítr in the original language

10th-century Norwegian women
10th-century women writers
10th-century writers
10th-century Norwegian poets
Norwegian women poets
Medieval women poets